The FN Barracuda is a double-action multi-caliber revolver designed by and built by Astra-Unceta y Cia SA to Fabrique Nationale's specifications. It can be switched between three calibers (9×19mm Parabellum, .38 Special and .357 Magnum) by changing parts of the cylinder. FN decided to enter the revolver market, aiming to satisfy law enforcement customers on both sides of the Atlantic, and this gun represented their only attempt at doing so, in collaboration with Astra. Production stopped around 1989 after poor sales. The revolver itself is generally thought to be well-made, but it targeted a diminishing revolver market for law enforcement.

Design details
Fairly standard in design, with respect to other double action / single action (DA/SA) heavy frame revolvers, the key design difference between the FN Barracuda and other brands is the rapidly interchangeable cylinder, allowing the user to easily switch between 9×19mm Parabellum, .38 Special, and .357 Magnum calibers. The gun has a pinned barrel, five-screwed frame assembly, and an internal coil hammer spring that can be adjusted for trigger pull weight, among other details.

Collectability
Prices vary strongly based on the availability of the various cylinders and the condition of the revolver. It has been imported to the US, and previous sellers have sold imported guns at $275, but auction prices for a complete set in good condition will reach close to $600.

References

External links
Modern Firearms
Guns.com

.38 Special firearms
9mm Parabellum revolvers
.357 Magnum firearms
Barracuda
Weapons and ammunition introduced in 1974